The 1977 Raquette d'Or was a men's tennis tournament staged in Aix-en-Provence, France that was part of the One star category of the 1977 Grand Prix circuit. The tournament was played on outdoor clay courts and was held from 26 September until 2 October 1977. It was the inaugural edition of the tournament. Ilie Năstase won the singles title. In a five-set final against Guillermo Vilas he had won the first two sets when Vilas retired in protest of Năstase's use of a spaghetti strung racquet (which was banned shortly after by the ITF).

Finals

Singles
 Ilie Năstase defeated  Guillermo Vilas 6–1, 7–5, def.
 It was Năstase's 3rd singles title of the year and the 62nd of his career.

Doubles
 Ilie Năstase /  Ion Țiriac defeated  Patrice Dominguez /  Rolf Norberg 1–6, 7–5, 6–3, 6–3

References

Raquette d'Or
Raquette d'Or
Raquette d'Or
Raquette d'Or